Phillip Bradley Bird (born September 24, 1957) is an American film director, animator, screenwriter, producer, and voice actor. He has had a career spanning forty years in both animation and live-action. 

Bird was born in Montana and grew up in Oregon. He developed an interest in the art of animation early on, and completed his first short subject by age 14. Bird sent the film to Walt Disney Productions, leading to an apprenticeship from the studio's Nine Old Men. He attended the California Institute of the Arts in the late 1970s, and worked for Disney shortly thereafter.

In the 1980s, he worked in film development with various studios; he wrote the screenplay for *batteries not included, and developed two episodes of Amazing Stories for Steven Spielberg, including the influential Family Dog. Afterwards, Bird joined The Simpsons as creative consultant for eight seasons. He directed the 1999 feature The Iron Giant, adapted from a book by poet Ted Hughes; though critically lauded, it was a box-office bomb. He moved to Pixar where he wrote and directed two movies, The Incredibles (2004) and Ratatouille (2007) that were worldwide critical and financial smash hits; both earned Bird two Academy Award for Best Animated Feature wins and Best Original Screenplay nominations. He transitioned to live-action filmmaking with 2011's similarly successful Mission: Impossible – Ghost Protocol, but his 2015 effort Tomorrowland significantly underperformed. He returned to Pixar to develop Incredibles 2, which was released in 2018 and became the second highest-grossing animated picture of all-time.

As a filmmaker, Bird has been considered an auteur; he is known to supervise his projects to a high degree of detail. The bulk of Bird's filmography has attracted widespread acclaim; with the exception of Tomorrowland, all of his movies have high aggregate scores from viewers and critics. His films' themes have been subject to interpretation by commentators due to their parallels with novelist Ayn Rand's Objectivism philosophy, an analysis Bird has dismissed. He is known as an advocate for creative freedom and the possibilities of animation, and has criticized its stereotype as children's entertainment, or classification as a genre, rather than art.

Early life

Brad Bird was born in Kalispell, Montana, the youngest of four children to Marjorie A. (née Cross) and Philip Cullen Bird. His father worked in the propane business, and his grandfather, Francis Wesley "Frank" Bird, who was born in County Sligo, Ireland, was a president and chief executive of the Montana Power Company. Bird's fascination with filmmaking began at an early age. He started drawing at age three, with his first cartoons clear attempts at sequential storytelling. He was particularly enamored with animation after a screening of The Jungle Book (1967), and a family friend who had taken animation classes explained how the medium worked. Bird's father found a used camera that could shoot one frame at a time, and helped him setup the device for making films. He began animating his first short subject at age 11; that same year, his family connection introduced him to composer George Bruns, who set him up a tour of Walt Disney Productions in Burbank, California. Bird met the Nine Old Men—the animators responsible for the studio's earliest and most celebrated features—and proclaimed he would join them one day.

Bird has characterized his parents as generous and supportive of his interests. His mother once made a rainy drive two hours each way to the only theater playing a reissue of Snow White and the Seven Dwarfs for Bird's education. After two years, Bird had completed his first short, a fifteen-minute adaption of The Tortoise and the Hare. On his parents' advice, to "start at the top and work your way down", he sent the film to his idols at Disney. The studio responded with an open invitation for Bird to stop by whenever in town, which led him to make several visits to the studio's California headquarters in the ensuing years. This opportunity—an "unofficial apprenticeship" of sorts—was "never offered" to anyone previously. He worked closely with Milt Kahl, whom he considered a hero. He began another film, titled Ecology American Style, which was more ambitious and in color, but the workload was intense. Instead, Bird focused on other interests in his high school years, including dating, athletics, and photography. "Animation is the illusion of life, and you can't create that illusion convincingly if you haven't lived it," he later remarked. The family relocated to Corvallis, Oregon in his youth, and he graduated from Corvallis High School in 1975.

That year, he was awarded a scholarship by Disney to attend the newly formed California Institute of the Arts (CalArts) in Valencia, California; Bird has joked he was a "retired" animator by the time he received this offer. Instead, he considered attending the acting program at Ashland University. After a three-year break, Bird chose CalArts and moved down south. Bird's classmates included prominent future animators such as John Lasseter, Tim Burton, and Henry Selick. Like many students, they were dazed by the special effects in Star Wars (1977); both Lasseter and Bird agreed these feats were possible in animation. First-year students met in the room labeled A113—a small, sterile classroom with no windows. Bird later used A113 as an Easter egg in his films; it has since become a fixture of media made by the school's alumni. The first use of A113 was in the pilot episode for the short-lived television series Family Dog (1993). The pilot episode was a part of the series Amazing Stories (1985-1987), which aired February 16, 1987, and was titled "Family Dog." He used it for the license plate number on a van. The first Disney movie he used it in was The Brave Little Toaster (1987), in which he was an animator.

Career

Initial years

Disney and development deals (1978–1984)
Within two years, Bird accepted a job as an animator at Walt Disney Productions. Bird arrived at the studio in the midst of a transition: much of the studio's original creative staff were retiring, leaving the studio to a new generation of artists. What was left of the original staff got along with the newcomers, but Bird clashed with the middlemen in charge. While animating at Disney, he became a part of a small group of animators who worked in a suite of offices inside the original studio called the "Rat's Nest". There, Bird openly criticized the state of the studio, and characterized senior leadership as unwilling to take risk. He felt as though he was standing behind the studio's original principles. This volatile attitude prompted his firing by animation administrator Edward Hansen. He left Disney after only two years; he received credits on The Small One (1978) and The Fox and the Hound (1981), and went uncredited on Mickey's Christmas Carol (1983) and The Black Cauldron (1985).

Bird was dispirited with the state of the American animation industry, and he considered his departure from Disney as the end of his long-held love of the form. Still, he pulled together funds to make A Portfolio of Projects, a demo reel of potential animated projects, ones he felt the medium was capable of. Bird was hopeful of receiving financial backing from other studios, but ended up frustrated by Hollywood's development system: "for every good project I've made, I've got equally good projects that are sitting [un-produced by] various studios," he said in 2018. He relocated to the Bay Area, eager to become a part of its burgeoning film scene, which birthed films like Apocalypse Now and The Black Stallion. He tried for several years to adapt Will Eisner's comic book The Spirit to feature animation, but studios declined, unwilling to take a risk given Disney's dominance. He briefly attempted a computer-animated film at Lucasfilm with Ed Catmull, presaging his later work with Pixar. "He had all these ideas for making animated movies, but he didn't have a technical bone in his body and he didn't have any tolerance that you would need to have at the time to put up with some of the awfulness of the early technology," said Alvy Ray Smith. Bird's next credit was as an animator on the dark animated drama The Plague Dogs (1982); he was also fired by the film's director, Martin Rosen, during its production.

Work with Steven Spielberg (1985–1989)
One piece from his test reel was Family Dog, which attracted the attention of director Steven Spielberg. Family Dog is centered on a pet's perspective of his dysfunctional suburban family, and its original pencil test featured designs by Bird's classmate Tim Burton. Bird had hoped to develop the concept into theatrical shorts, like those from the golden age of American animation, but the market simply no longer existed. Instead, Bird moved back to Los Angeles and joined Spielberg's Amblin Entertainment, and became involved with his television program Amazing Stories, an anthology series which debuted in 1985. He co-wrote the screenplay for "The Main Attraction", the show's second episode, with Mick Garris. Spielberg enjoyed the script, and invited Bird to pitch other ideas. Bird storyboarded another Family Dog segment, which was decided to be adapted into an episode of Amazing Stories. The episode, which aired in 1987, was a ratings success. The experience was exciting for Bird; "Not only was Steven one of my favorite filmmakers, but he was powerful enough to clear space that allowed us creative freedom," he later remarked. Family Dog was later spun-off into its own half-hour sitcom, against Bird's urging and without his involvement, as he felt the idea would not work. He was also perturbed to see Burton's role in designing the characters overshadow his deeper contributions to the concept.

He was later brought on to co-write the screenplay for Batteries Not Included (1987), a comic sci-fi film that stemmed from an Amazing Stories outline. The film opened in fourth place domestically, and was overall a box office hit, generating $65.1 million on its $25 million budget. Bird also helped with Captain EO, 3-D short film starring Michael Jackson viewed at Disney theme parks. These successes brought Bird more opportunity, but he continued to spend many years in development hell with studios. He grew irritated with notes from middle management: executives he felt "would analyze your work and dictate everything you'd need to do to make it 'more pleasing to an audience'—and in the process would only make stories smaller and more like everything else," he complained. In his personal life, he wed Elizabeth Canney, an editor on *batteries not included. In 1989, Bird's sister Susan, with whom he was very close, was killed by her estranged husband in a murder-suicide. The event was traumatic for Bird; he felt emotionally "kind of gone in that period. I don't really have a lot of memories from it." He had enough funds to support himself for a time, so he simply rested: "I just kind of didn't do anything," he confessed.

Career moves

Work on The Simpsons (1989–1996)
Bird's cinematic sense of visual storytelling with Family Dog was uncommon in television animation to that point, mainly due to budgetary restrictions. Most television productions retained a rudimentary style, with frequent abuse of standard close-ups, medium angles, and establishing shots to move the story along. In contrast, Bird favored using more filmic techniques, utilizing extreme angles, long panning shots, quick camera cuts, pushed perspective, and so on. Bird's work on Family Dog caught the eye of producers James L. Brooks and Sam Simon, who with Matt Groening were developing The Simpsons, the first prime time animated sitcom in decades for Fox. In 1989, he was invited to join Klasky Csupo (and later Film Roman), where he served as executive consultant for the show. The role required Bird oversee the script-to-animation pipeline 2–3 days per week.

Bird worked on the show for its first eight seasons, and directed the episodes "Krusty Gets Busted" (1990) and "Like Father, Like Clown" (1992). He also designed the character Sideshow Bob. In his role, he pushed the show's artists to visualize episodes as miniature films, taking inspiration from the work of Stanley Kubrick and Orson Welles. In the 1990s, Bird also contributed to other episodic animated sitcoms like The Critic and King of the Hill, both of which took cues from this established template. Bird called his work at The Simpsons a "golden opportunity," recognizing that the material was more to his sensibility than the work he had done for Disney. On a personal level, the job was deeply fulfilling; he attended weekly read-throughs which he found delightful, and he considered the gig the only bright spot in the years following his sister's passing. His last credit on the show came with the episode "Lisa the Simpson", which aired in 1998. The show's crew hoped to get Bird to direct its later 2007 film adaptation, but he was too busy by that point.

The Iron Giant (1997–2000)

Animation had a commercial and creative renaissance in the U.S. during the 1990s, with Hollywood studios eager to capitalize on the success of Disney's The Lion King (1994). Bird continued to shop around film ideas to studios throughout the decade, but grew frustrated with his lack of progress in his dream of directing a feature. He was momentarily signed to direct a live-action comedy, Brothers in Crime, at New Line Cinema, but it did not pan out. In addition, his growing family gave rise to other concerns. "I had anxiety about devoting my energy to work that was meaningful and spending time with my family, which was also meaningful to me. If I did one, would I fail at the other?" he worried. He pored these themes into a screenplay for The Incredibles, which he pitched to studios beginning in 1992. He also developed an original sci-fi feature titled Ray Gunn, with a script co-written by Matthew Robbins. Its futuristic story centered on a private detective in an Art Deco world of humans and aliens. Bird signed a production deal with Turner Feature Animation in January 1995, but the studio felt Ray Gunn would be too intense for its target demographic of young children. The following year, Turner merged with Time Warner, which contained the last three months of Bird's contract.

Warner executives set up a meeting, and made it clear they had no interest in Ray Gunn. Instead, they offered Bird several in-development projects, including a musical version of poet Ted Hughes' book The Iron Man, first envisioned by rocker Pete Townshend. Bird read the novel and felt "enchanted" by it; he felt drawn to Hughes' rationale for writing the story, which was to comfort his children after the death of his wife, Sylvia Plath. Bird connected with its themes, relating it to his sister's passing from gun violence. He significantly revised the entire story to center on a central question: "What if a gun had a soul?" Warner leadership was sold and Bird signed the contract to direct The Iron Giant in December 1996. Bird penned the screenplay with Tim McCanlies, which centers on a young boy named Hogarth Hughes, who discovers and befriends a giant alien robot  during the Cold War in 1957.

He was quickly faced with assembling a team with little time to spare; most big-budget animated films of the era were workshopped for years, whereas Bird only had two. Adding to the pressure was Bird's frequent disagreements with the film's co-producer, Allison Abbate. In a trade-off, the crew received significant creative freedom to make the film they wanted to make, though Bird occasionally fielded suggestions from executives to make the film more merchandisable or kid-friendly. The film scored highly on test screenings, but Warner neglected to secure prominent promotion for the movie. The Iron Giant opened in August 1999 to rave reviews from critics, but very low ticket sales; theater owners discarded the picture after only a few weeks. Altogether, the movie grossed $31.3 million worldwide against its $50 million budget, which was considered a significant loss for Warner. Upon its arrival on home video, the film took on a cult following. Bird was disappointed by the failure of Giant; he visited multiple cineplexes only to view the film in empty auditoriums. Afterwards, he was briefly attached to direct a Curious George adaptation for Universal, but he instead set his sights toward another animation studio: Pixar.

Path to Pixar and beyond

The Incredibles and Ratatouille (2000–2008)
In the late 1990s, Bird reconnected with old friend John Lasseter, who went on to work for Pixar, the computer hardware maker that had recently moved into animation. The company released the first fully computer-animated feature film, Toy Story, in 1995. Bird was stunned by the film, and in 1997, the two began to negotiate Bird joining Pixar. In March 2000, Bird went to Pixar's Emeryville, California campus and pitched his ideas, including The Incredibles, to Lasseter. The studio announced a multi-film contract with Bird in May of that year, making Bird the first outside voice for the studio, which previously required talent to rise through the ranks. He was excited to return to the Bay Area, where had lived intermittently two decades prior. He purchased a home in Tiburon, across the bay from Pixar's Emeryville headquarters. He grew comforted by the "creative and supportive" atmosphere at Pixar, unlike many of the L.A. studios he had worked for; he convinced a core team to join him up north, including artists Tony Fucile, Teddy Newton, and Lou Romano, all of whom had contributed development artwork for The Incredibles for much of the past decade.

The Incredibles the film follows Bob (Craig T. Nelson) and Helen Parr (Holly Hunter), a couple of superheroes, known as Mr. Incredible and Elastigirl, who hide their powers in accordance with a government mandate, and attempt to live a quiet suburban life with their three children. Bob's desire to help people draws the entire family into a confrontation with a vengeful fan-turned-foe, Syndrome. Bird also provides the voice of costume designer Edna Mode. As an inside joke, the character Syndrome was based on Bird's likeness (as was Mr. Incredible) and according to him, he did not realize the joke until the movie was too far into production to have it changed. The animation team was tasked with creating computer animation's first an all-human cast, which required creating new technology to animate detailed human anatomy, clothing, and realistic skin and hair. Michael Giacchino composed the film's orchestral score, marking the first in a series of collaboration between the two men. The Incredibles was Bird's first global critical and box-office smash, grossing $631.4 million, making it the fourth-highest-grossing film of 2004. Bird won his first Academy Award for Best Animated Feature, and his screenplay was nominated for Best Original Screenplay. It was the first animated film to win the prestigious Hugo Award for Best Dramatic Presentation.

Bird's next project was Ratatouille (2007), which follows a rat named Remy, who dreams of becoming a chef and tries to achieve his goal by forming an alliance with a Parisian restaurant's garbage boy. The film was developed by Jan Pinkava, who worked on the concept for many years. By the time the project was slated to enter the animation process, Pixar leadership became concerned it was not ready. Bird was hired on in July 2005 to assess the mistakes and turn the project around in a short time. He disliked having to take over Pinkva's passion project: "It was a rough position to be in because I always come down on the side of the creator," he later said. However, he was also in position with Pixar as a member of their "brain trust"—a group of individuals who critique and help each other—so he felt the role came naturally. When Bird took over, much of the design work had been completed, but Bird wrote an entirely new script that eschewed much of its original dialogue. Giacchino returned to compose the Paris-inspired music for the film. Upon release, Ratatouille was another huge hit for Pixar; the film grossed $623.7 million and earned widespread critical acclaim. It won the Best Animated Feature award at the 2008 Golden Globes; it was also nominated for five Academy Awards, including Best Original Screenplay and Best Animated Feature, which it won.

Move to live-action: Ghost Protocol and Tomorrowland (2008–2015)
Midway through the aughts, Bird was attached to direct an adaption of James Dalessandro's novel, 1906, which chronicles the tumultuous earthquake that struck San Francisco a century prior. Due to the size and scale of such a project, three studios were to finance its making—Pixar, Disney, and Warner Bros.—but the project stalled. He paused when Pixar management asked he take over Ratatouille, and returned afterward. He attempted to re-write 1906 to work within the confines of a feature's length, but struggled. Instead, Bird helmed the next installment of the action spy series Mission: Impossible, starring Tom Cruise.

Bird's foray into live-action filmmaking after a major career in animation had little precedent, according to critics. Cruise had been impressed by the style and storytelling of Incredibles, and urged Bird to contact him should he venture into the live-action sphere. The idea of combining the commercial aspects of a franchise—this was the third Mission sequel—and more artistic tones challenged Bird, who signed on to direct in May 2010. In the picture, Cruise reprises his role of Impossible Missions Force agent Ethan Hunt, who with his team race against time to find a nuclear extremist who gains access to Russian nuclear launch codes. Ghost Protocol was shot on location partially in Dubai, and includes a memorable scene when Cruise scales the newly erected Burj Khalifa. Upon release in December 2011, it became the highest-grossing film in the series up to that point, with $694 million worldwide. It was the fifth-highest-grossing film of 2011 as well as the second-highest-grossing film starring Cruise.

Though he was asked to direct Star Wars: The Force Awakens, Bird turned down the opportunity to focus on his new project: the sci-fi film Tomorrowland, named for the futuristic themed land found at Disney theme parks. Bird co-wrote the screenplay with Damon Lindelof. In the film, a disillusioned genius inventor (George Clooney) and a teenage science enthusiast (Britt Robertson) embark to an intriguing alternate dimension known as "Tomorrowland," where their actions directly affect their own world. The film ended up being a box-office bomb, losing Disney $120–150 million, and attracting a mixed critical response.

Latest work

Incredibles 2 (2015–2018)
Bird was long open to the idea of Incredibles sequel, should the story suffice. Over the years, he mentioned its possibility in interviews, and these suspicions were confirmed when an official sequel was announced in 2014. Bird began writing its screenplay in earnest the next year; he attempted to distinguish the script from the breadth of superhero-related content released since the first film, focusing on the family dynamic rather than the superhero genre. The story follows the Incredibles as they try to restore the public's trust in superheroes while balancing their family life, only to combat a new foe who seeks to turn the populace against all superheroes. Though scheduled for release on June 21, 2019, the film was completed on an accelerated production schedule, as it was farther ahead in production than Toy Story 4, which required more development and was later released on that day; the two simply swapped years, with Incredibles 2 debuting in theaters on June 15, 2018. Giacchano returned to compose the score.

Incredibles 2 was a smash hit for Disney/Pixar: it made $182.7 million in its opening weekend, setting the record for best debut for an animated film, and grossed over $1.2 billion worldwide, making it the second-highest-grossing animated film in general, the highest-grossing Pixar film, and the fourth-highest-grossing film of the year. Incredibles 2 was named by the National Board of Review as the Best Animated Film of 2018. The film was nominated for Best Animated Feature at the 76th Golden Globe Awards and 91st Academy Awards, but lost both awards to Spider-Man: Into the Spider-Verse.

Recent events (2019–present)
Bird has expressed interest in developing an animated Western or horror film. In 2019, Bird announced he was developing an original musical film that would include music by frequent collaborator Michael Giacchino and contain about 20 minutes of animation in it. In 2022, it was announced that Bird had signed a deal with Skydance the previous year to revive his long-dormant project Ray Gunn and reassembled frequent collaborators Michael Giacchino, Teddy Newton, Tony Fucile, Darren T. Holmes and Jeffrey Lynch for the film.

Style and themes

Bird says he was influenced by dozens of filmmakers, singling out early moviemakers Buster Keaton, Charlie Chaplin, and Harold Lloyd, to mid-twentieth century auteurs like David Lean, Alfred Hitchcock, Walt Disney, and Akira Kurosawa. More contemporary directors like Steven Spielberg, Francis Ford Coppola, George Lucas, Hayao Miyazaki, and the Coen brothers have inspired Bird as well. His passion for the medium was evident even in his college years; friend John Lasseter remembered, "Brad would hang out all night talking about Scorsese and Coppola and how he could do what they did in animation." Bird's career trajectory has been considered somewhat unusual: he did not direct his first film until he was in his forties. Bird himself has observed that his career was "very long, very delayed and full of disappointment," mainly because he aspired to "lofty" self-set expectations.

He has been characterized as controlling with an exquisite attention to detail. His "demanding, often punishing" direction which has prompted some to consider him difficult to work with. Bird is outspoken about the potential of the art of animation, and has asked the public not refer to his films as cartoons. In the audio commentary for the home release of The Incredibles, Bird joked he would fight the next person to refer to animated movies as a "genre", as opposed to art form.
He has also taken exception to the classification of modern animated fare as solely for children or families; suggesting it discriminatory and belittling. He has expressed a love for hand-drawn animation and lamented its current absence from the industry.

Many critics have analyzed his films and suggested they reflect Russian-American novelist Ayn Rand's Objectivism philosophy, which Bird vehemently denies, suggesting it a monumental misreading of his work. Though he claims he was drawn to Rand's work in his younger years, he offers, "Me being the Ayn Rand guy is a lazy piece of criticism." He stated that a large portion of the audience understood the message as he intended whereas "two percent thought I was doing The Fountainhead or Atlas Shrugged." Tomorrowland plot line—a group of geniuses form a utopia to sequester themselves from the world—has been considered reminiscent of Atlas Shrugged and its Galt Gulch enclave. In The Incredibles, father Bob Parr complains of what he feels is society's increasing celebration of mediocrity, and later in the film, its villain Syndrome asserts that "when everyone's super, no one will be." Analysts suggested these lines a reflection of views shared by German philosopher Friedrich Nietzsche. One writer distilled Ratatouille down to "if you don't have talent, you should get out of the way of people who do." David Sims at The Atlantic has suggested Bird's films are instead "stories about the frustrations of unbridled creativity [...] In each film, there's an indelible recurring image: the frustrated genius, locked away in a dusty closet, obsessing over the talents he has to hide." Likewise, IndieWire's Eric Kohn called Bird a "pivotal figure in exploring the American dream through the vernacular of popular culture."

Personal life
Bird and his wife Elizabeth (m. 1988) have three sons; Nicholas, who voiced Squirt in the Pixar film Finding Nemo, Rusty McAllister, who voiced Rusty the bike boy in The Incredibles and Michael, who voiced Tony Rydinger in The Incredibles and its sequel. Bird maintains properties in Tiburon, California, and Los Feliz, California.

Upon criticism that The Incredibles exhibited a right-wing bias, Bird demurred, noting, "I'm definitely a centrist and feel like both parties can be absurd."

Filmography

Feature films

Animator
 Animalympics (1980)
 The Fox and the Hound (1981) (Uncredited)
 The Plague Dogs (1982)
 The Black Cauldron (1985) (Uncredited)
 The Brave Little Toaster (1987) (Uncredited)
 The Iron Giant (1999) (Uncredited)

Voice roles

Pixar Senior Creative Team
 WALL-E (2008)
 Up (2009)
 Toy Story 3 (2010)
 Cars 2 (2011)
 Brave (2012)
 Monsters University (2013)
 Inside Out (2015)
 The Good Dinosaur (2015)
 Finding Dory (2016)
 Cars 3 (2017)
 Coco (2017)
 Incredibles 2 (2018)
 Toy Story 4 (2019)

Uncredited brain trust
 Monsters, Inc. (2001)
 Finding Nemo (2003)
 The Incredibles (2004)
 Cars (2006)
 Ratatouille (2007)

Short films

Documentary featurettes

Television

Other credits

Video games
Voice role

Special thanks
 An American Tail (1986)
 Technological Threat (1988)
 Who Framed Roger Rabbit (1988)
 The SpongeBob SquarePants Movie (2004)
 Corpse Bride (2005)
 Friz on Film (2006)
 Fog City Mavericks (2007)
 Madison's Résumé (2007)
 The Pixar Story (2007)
 Calendar Confloption (2009)
 Partly Cloudy (2009)
 Day & Night (2010)
 Pinched (2010)
 Toy Story of Terror! (2013)
 Jurassic World (2015)
 Bao (2018)
 Frozen II (2019)
 Canvas (2020)
 Pixar Popcorn: Chore Day The Incredibles Way (2021)
 Pixar Popcorn: Cookie Num Num (2021)
 Lightyear (2022)
 Werewolf by Night (2022)

Unmade projects
 The Spirit, an animated feature based on the comic Bird developed with Jerry Rees and producer Gary Kurtz, based on Will Eisner's acclaimed comic strip. The studios they pitched it to liked the script, but were unwilling to take the gamble on an animated feature for the adult audience. Bird was then replaced by various directors, but ultimately replaced by veteran comic-book writer Frank Miller and was released on Christmas 2008 to critical and commercial negative reviews.
 The Incredible Mr. Limpet, a project that is still in development hell. Bird was attached to direct at one point but was replaced by Mike Judge and many others.
 Curious George, wrote a draft of the film at one point, but his script was not used in the produced version. 
 The Simpsons Movie, the crew from The Simpsons including James L. Brooks and Matt Groening were hoping to get Bird to direct, but was too busy with The Incredibles and Ratatouille at the time. David Silverman, who was also working at Pixar at the time and quit his job after finishing work on Monsters, Inc., became the film's director.
 1906, a collaborative project from Warner Bros. and Pixar (which could have been their first live-action project), in association with Walt Disney Pictures, where Bird would have directed. Disney and Pixar left the project in 2012 in development limbo at Warner Bros. due to delays in the film's several planned releases, several rejected scripts were not picked up, and going over budget ($200 million). However , Bird has expressed interest as to adapt the book as a TV series and the earthquake sequence as a live-action feature film.
 Star Wars: The Force Awakens, Bird was on a shortlist of directors to direct the seventh Star Wars film. He passed on the project in favor of Tomorrowland; The Force Awakens was directed by J. J. Abrams.
 Sonic the Hedgehog, Bird was featured on a shortlist of writers when the film was still in development at Columbia Pictures. After Jeff Fowler was chosen to direct, Pat Casey and Josh Miller were picked as writers.

Critical reception
Critical response to films Bird has directed:

Accolades
In addition to his Academy Award, BAFTA Award and Saturn Award wins, Bird holds the record of the most animation Annie Award wins with eight, winning both Best Directing and Best Writing for each of The Iron Giant, The Incredibles and Ratatouille, as well as Best Voice Acting for The Incredibles. His eighth Annie was the 2011 Winsor McCay Award for lifetime contribution to animation.

See also
A113
Directors with two films rated A+ by CinemaScore

References

Notes

Citations

Sources

External links

1957 births
Living people
21st-century American male actors
Actors from Manhattan Beach, California
Animators from Montana
Animators from Oregon
American film producers
American feminists
American male voice actors
American people of Irish descent
American male screenwriters
American storyboard artists
American animated film directors
American animated film producers
Animation screenwriters
Annie Award winners
California Institute of the Arts alumni
Centrism in the United States
Corvallis High School (Oregon) alumni
Directors of Best Animated Feature Academy Award winners
Film directors from California
Film directors from Montana
Film directors from Oregon
Hugo Award-winning writers
Male actors from Montana
Male actors from Oregon
Male feminists
People from Kalispell, Montana
Pixar people
Science fiction film directors
Screenwriters from Oregon
Screenwriters from California
Screenwriters from Montana
Skydance Media people
Walt Disney Animation Studios people
Writers from Corvallis, Oregon
Writers from Montana